Extreme Noise Terror (often abbreviated to ENT) are a British extreme metal band formed in Ipswich, England in 1985 and one of the earliest and most influential crust bands. Noted for one of the earliest uses of dual vocalists in hardcore, and for recording a number of sessions for BBC Radio 1 DJ John Peel, the band started as crust punks and helped characterise the early, archetypal grindcore sound with highly political lyrics, fast guitars and tempos, and often very short songs.

Biography

Early years
Extreme Noise Terror were formed in early 1985 in Ipswich, England, originally consisting of dual vocalists Dean Jones and Phil Vane, guitarist Pete Hurley, bassist Jerry Clay and drummer Darren "Pig Killer" Olley. Prior to ENT, Vane and Hurley had played with Discharge-influenced acts Freestate and Victims of War, whilst Jones had been singing with Raw Noise. Hurley claims that the band name came from an insert for an album by the Dutch band Lärm: "It featured a bandanna-ed hardcore kid with 'Extreme Noise Terror' surrounding him. Those three words summed up exactly what we were aiming at." Aside from Discharge, the band cite as early influences Anti Cimex, Rattus and Antisect, another early proponent of the "one high, one low" vocal approach. ENT signed to the small UK-based indie label Manic Ears after a solitary gig supporting Chaos UK.

Their first release for the label was a split LP with Chaos UK in 1986, entitled Radioactive Earslaughter. Although there were still musical similarities between the two bands, ENT were already beginning to twist hardcore into what would later become known as "grindcore". ENT have however expressed misgivings about the use of the term:

In 1987, ENT came to the attention of John Peel, on the recommendation of fellow Ipswich group The Stupids. After seeing them live at the Caribbean Centre in Ipswich with his wife and son, Peel offered them their first (of four) Peel Session for BBC Radio 1, which was released through Strange Fruit. A second Peel Session was recorded the following May.

During this period, the drum stool was filled by former Napalm Death drummer Mick Harris, although he left soon afterward to form Scorn and was replaced by Tony "Stick" Dickens (of crust band Doom). Bassist Clay was replaced by Mark Gardener, and this line-up recorded ENT's debut album, A Holocaust in Your Head, which was later voted number 3 in Terrorizers essential European grindcore albums, who described it as "marrying a thick crust-punk crunch and vitriolic lyrical assault with the newborn, clattering fury of grindcore, 'Holocaust...' followed Napalm's heroic uppercuts and haymakers with a Doc Martin in the goolies." The band undertook a headline tour of both Europe and Japan in support of the album. In 1990, Jones and future ENT guitarist Ali Firouzbakht guested on Raw Noise's "Sound of Destruction" single release, and bassist Gardener was replaced by Pete Nash from the band Doom.

Collaboration with the KLF

On their return from Japan, ENT were invited to perform their third Peel Session, which was released along with their first as a full-length LP by Strange Fruit. The band then embarked on another European tour, after which they released their second record, Phonophobia, through Vinyl Japan and returned to tour Japan once again. Further radio support from John Peel brought ENT to the attention of Bill Drummond of The KLF; the two acts got in touch and Drummond asked ENT to re-record a version of KLF's hit single "3 a.m. Eternal", with the intention of the band performing live on Top of the Pops at Christmas.

The BBC, however, felt that the song was inappropriate for broadcast on daytime television and thus refused to air the track, leading to the KLF boycotting the show. The single eventually saw limited edition release through KLF Communications and won Single of the Week from both the NME and Melody Maker. ENT also worked on the abandoned KLF album The Black Room (the KLF had previously released an ambient album called The White Room), but when Drummond and KLF co-member Jimmy Cauty announced the band's retirement, they also deleted the recordings.

When asked how the collaboration came about, Jones said: "What actually happened was that Bill heard us on Peel when he was in the bath and got in touch. They had wanted to do rock versions of their songs with Motörhead but something fell through, so he rang us... The message said it's Bill from The KLF, but I thought they said 'the ALF' so I didn't take much notice... Later, we got another message saying it was definitely Bill from The KLF and I said 'f--- off! What does he want with us?' But it all got explained eventually." The two bands were later asked to appear at the 1992 BRIT Awards, at which they caused controversy by firing blanks from machine guns into the audience, a performance that the NME listed at number 4 in their "top 100 rock moments".

Retro-bution, Vane's departure and subsequent albums
Extreme Noise Terror continued to tour throughout 1993 and 1994, and underwent further line-up changes; drummer Dickens left to join DIRT and was replaced by former member Pig Killer, Lee Barrett (founder of Candlelight Records and also member of Disgust) took over on bass, and Ali Firouzbakht joined on lead guitar. At the request of Digby Pearson, this line-up signed to Earache in June 1994 and recorded Retro-bution, essentially a compilation of re-recorded material from the band's earlier days, which was released in January 1995. The motivation behind this release was due to the band's dissatisfaction with their earlier recordings and saw ENT take a slightly more metal direction, including the addition of some guitar solos. A short UK tour followed, followed by touring in Europe and the US and a further line-up change occurred with Pig Killer being replaced by former Cradle of Filth drummer William A. "Was" Sarginson.  (After several years as a professional photographer, in 2013 Pig Killer joined The Featherz under the name Dazzle Monroe.) The line-up changes continued with the departure of founder member Phil Vane, who left to join Napalm Death in late 1996. In an example of trading places, Napalm Death frontman Mark "Barney" Greenway agreed to join ENT during the recording of their next album, Damage 381.

The album, whose title comes from the BPM recorded on the title track, saw ENT moving further into death metal territory, reincorporating some of the blast beats and screamed vocals that had been missing from their previous two releases. The album benefited from a production from noted metal producer Colin Richardson. At the same time Napalm Death were having a hard time getting the vocals that they wanted from Vane and asked Greenway to return, which he agreed to do, leaving ENT once again lacking a second vocalist. Vane subsequently returned to the band in 1997.

Further line-up changes occurred in 1999, with Vane once again departing to be replaced by Adam Catchpole, Sarginson being replaced by Zac O'Neil, and former Cradle of Filth member Gian Pyres joining on lead guitar. In 2001, the band signed to Candlelight and released their fourth full-length album, Being and Nothing. The band also played a fourth session for BBC Radio 1 in February 2001 and continued to tour round Europe, including a slot on the main stage at Wacken Open Air in 2003.

Recent activity
Ever struggling with line-up problems, Paul "Woody" Woodfield took over on lead guitar for studio and live duties in early 2001, whilst Stafford Glover took over on bass (from the departing Barrett, who left to concentrate on To-Mera) and Desecration's Ollie Jones was added to the line-up as permanent second guitarist. In early 2006, Phil Vane once again returned to the band after living in Switzerland for six and a half years. Zac O'Neil also left the band, to be replaced by Mic Hourihan (of Desecration and  Tigertailz). In 2007, ENT toured the US with grindcore band Phobia and released a split recording with Driller Killer through French label Osmose. The following year the band released a split 7-inch with Trap Them (released on Deathwish Inc.) to coincide with their joint US West Coast Distortion tour, which culminated at the 2008 Los Angeles Murderfest. In amongst playing shows worldwide, including Indonesia, Russia, Hungary, Slovenia, Romania, Finland, Germany, Estonia and at the Obscene Extreme Festival in the Czech Republic, ENT recorded their next album, Law of Retaliation which was released in early 2009 by Osmose in Europe, MCR Company in Japan, and Deep Six Records in the US. Terrorizer described it as "a rabid, intense and gleeful return to explosive, hyper-speed hardcore punk insanity". The band continued to tour with shows throughout 2009 in Europe and a third Japanese tour, this time with Slang.

Though still fiercely political, in recent years the band has become more open-minded regarding some of their beliefs, especially concerning vegetarianism, and the use of drugs and alcohol. Jones commented:

On 17 February 2011, Phil Vane died in his sleep due to a cerebrovascular accident at the age of 46. The band have continued to tour and release music with former Gorerotted and The Rotted frontman Ben McCrow, with the band dedicating their 2015 self-titled album to Vane's memory.

Members
Current
 Dean Jones – vocals (1985–present)
 Ben McCrow – vocals (2014–present)
 Ollie Jones – guitars (2005–present)
 Dicky Moore – bass (2019–present)
 Michael Hourihan – drums (2008–2011, 2014–present)

Former

 Phil Vane – vocals (1985-1999, 2006–2011; died 2011)
 Pete Hurley – guitars (1985–1995; died 2014)
 Jerry Clay – bass (1985–1988)
 Darren "Pig Killer" Olley – drums (1985–1987, 1993–1995)
 Mick Harris – drums (1987–1988, 2008)
 Tony "Stick" Dickens – drums (1988–1999)
 Si Brown – drums (1990)
 Mark Gardener – bass (1988)
 Peter (Doom) Nash – bass (1988–1990)
 Spit – vocals (1989)
 Mark Bailey – bass (1990–1994)
 Lee Barrett – bass (1994–1997)
 William A. "Was" Sarginson – drums (1995–1997)

 Ali Firouzbakht  – lead guitar (1995–2005)
 Mark "Barney" Greenway – vocals (1996–1997)
 Zac O`Neil – drums (1997–2008)
 Manny Cooke – bass (1997–2001)
 Jose Kurt – vocals (1999–2000)
 Adam Catchpole – vocals (2000–2006)
 Stafford Glover – bass (2001–2012)
 Andi Morris - bass (2012-2019)
 Woody – rhythm guitar (2001–2010, 2011–2014)
 Chris 'Chino' Casket – rhythm guitar, bass (studio: 2009–2014/live: 2010–2012)
 Roman Matuszewski – vocals (2011–2012)
 Barney Monger – drums (2011–2014)
 John Loughlin – vocals (2012–2014)

Timeline

Discography

Studio albums
 A Holocaust in Your Head (1989)
 Retro-bution (1995)
 Damage 381 (1997)
 Being and Nothing (2001)
 Law of Retaliation (2008)
 Extreme Noise Terror (2015)

Split albums
 Extreme Noise Terror/ Chaos UK (Radioactive Earslaughter) (1986)
 In It for Life (1989)
 Discharged: From Home Front to War Front (1991)
 Extreme Noise Terror / Driller Killer (2007)
 Extreme Noise Terror / Trap Them (2008)
 Extreme Noise Terror / Cock E.S.P. (2009)
 Hardcore Attack of the Low Life Dogs (2010)
 Extreme Noise Terror / The Dwarves (2016)
 Daily Holocaust (2017)

EPs
 The Peel Sessions (1987)
 Phonophobia (1992)
 Hatred and the Filth (2004)
 Phonophobia II – The Second Coming (2009) (Features two new studio tracks - credits: Barney Monger, Chris Casket, Dean Jones, Phil Vane
 Hardcore Attack of the Low Life Dogs (2010)
 Tear It Down (2013)
 Chained and Crazed (2015)

Live albums
 Are You That Desperate? (1989)
 The Peel Sessions '87–'90 (1990)
 The Split Noiz Live EP (1990)
 Live & Loud (1990)

Compilation albums
 Back to the Roots (2008)

DVDs
 From One Extreme to Another (2003)

Music videos
 "Raping the Earth" (1995)
 "Awakening" (2002)
 "No One Is Innocent" (2016)
 "Dogma, Intolerance, Control" (2016)

See also
 List of The Peel Sessions artists

References

Further reading
 Boniwell, Alex (March 2009). In Grind We Crust. In Terrorizer 181, pp. 46–51.
 Mudrian, Albert (2004). Choosing Death: The Improbable History of Death Metal & Grindcore. Feral House. 
 Rodel, Angela (2004). Extreme Noise Terror: Punk Rock and the Aesthetics of Badness. In Bad Music: The Music We Love to Hate'', Washburne, Christopher J. (ed.) and Derko, Maiken (ed.), Routledge, pp. 235–256. .

External links
 

1985 establishments in England
British crust and d-beat groups
Candlelight Records artists
Deathwish Inc. artists
Earache Records artists
English grindcore musical groups
Musical groups established in 1985
Musical quintets
Political music groups